Estam University is an English speaking university in Cotonou, Benin. It is accredited by the Ministry Of Education in Cotonou, Benin Republic and the Ministry of Education in Abuja, Nigeria. The University offers 4-year B.Sc. programs in:

Industrial Maintenance
Electromechanical engineering
Industrial systems
Medical Equipment maintenance
Mechanical Engineering and Computing-integrated Manufacturing
Building and civil works engineering/Architecture
Electronics
Network Audits and Security
Computer Network and Telecommunications
Business Computing
Administration and Human Resource Management
Marketing and Advertising Negotiation
Transport and Logistics
Accounting and Management
Finance and Management Control
Audit and Management Control
Banking and Corporate Finance
Project Management

All Nigerian students that graduate are allowed to participate in the National Youth Service Corp (NYSC) scheme in Nigeria.

References

Universities and colleges in Benin